"What Could Have Been Love" is a power ballad by American hard-rock band Aerosmith that was released on August 22, 2012. It is featured on their studio album, Music from Another Dimension! A video for the single was released on October 18, 2012 on Vevo.com. The song premiered live on November 8, 2012 at the Chesapeake Energy Arena in Oklahoma City, Oklahoma.

In November 2012, the song charted at number 7 on the Japan Billboard Japan Hot 100 chart.

Charts

References

2012 singles
Aerosmith songs
Songs written by Steven Tyler
Songs written by Marti Frederiksen
Columbia Records singles
Rock ballads
2012 songs